Fahlstrøm or Fahlström or Fahlstrom is a surname. Notable people with the surname include:

Öyvind Fahlström (1928–1976), Swedish Multimedia artist
Alma Fahlstrøm (1863–1946), born in Denmark, Norwegian actress and theatre manager, wife of Johan Fahlstrøm
Jacob Fahlström (1795–1859), the first Swede ever to settle in Minnesota
Johan Fahlstrøm (1867–1938), Norwegian actor and theatre manager, husband of Alma Fahlstrøm
Kristian Fahlstrøm (1917–2005), Norwegian newspaper editor